Chaffey is a surname. Notable people with the surname include:

Ben Chaffey (1876–1937), Australian pastoralist, businessman and racehorse owner, son of George 
Bill Chaffey (1915–1987), Australian farmer and politician, son of Frank
Don Chaffey (1917–1990), British film director
Frank Chaffey (1888–1940), Australian politician, father of Bill 
George Chaffey (1848–1932), Canadian engineer, developer in California and Australia, father of Ben, brother of William
Mark Chaffey (born 1977), Australian rules footballer
John Chaffey, English actor
Pat Chaffey (born 1967), American football player
Paul Chaffey (born 1965), Norwegian politician
Sam Chaffey (1934–1998), New Zealand alpine skier
William Chaffey (1856–1926), Canadian engineer, developer in California and Australia, brother of George

See also
Chaffee (surname), a list of people with the surname Chaffee or Chafee